Yuvam (English:Youth) is a 2021 Malayalam political thriller drama film directed by Pinku Peter. The movie go through the journey of three young advocates, who tries to prevent KSRTC being privatised due to debts and the inlawful actions by some politicians.

Cast
Amith Chakalakkal as Adv. Aby Mathew
Abhirav Janan as Adv. Paul Varghese
Nirmal Palazhi as Adv. Vinod Janardhanan
Dayyana Hameed as Nimisha
Indrans as Adv. Sreekanth Panicker
Nedumudi Venu as Judge Ramakrishnan
Saikumar as Chief Minister D.K. Srinivasan
Vinod Kedamangalom
Chembil Ashokan
Kalabhavan Shajon as Rajesh MLA
Jaffar Idukki as Babu, Transport Minister
Kalabhavan Haneef as Chacko, KSRTC Employee
Baiju Ezhupunna as Sabu Vattappara
Vinod Kedamangalam as K.P. Amrith/Chachaji
Aneesh G Menon as Sushanth Nair IAS, District Collector-Trivandrum
Disney James as SI Kannappan

References

External links

2021 films
2020s Malayalam-language films
2021 thriller drama films